Karnali Province is one of the seven federal provinces of Nepal formed by the new constitution which was adopted on 20 September 2015. The total area of the province is  covering 18.97% of the country, making it the largest province in Nepal. According to the 2011 Nepal census, the population of the province was 1,570,418, making it the least populous province in Nepal. It borders the Tibet Autonomous Region of China to the north, Gandaki Province to the east, Sudurpashchim Province to the west, and Lumbini Province to the south. Birendranagar with a population of 154,886 is both the province's capital and largest city.

Etymology 
The province's name is derived from the Karnali River, which flows through the province. A meeting of the provincial assembly on 25 February 2018 adopted the name Karnali for the province.

History

Karnali is an old civilization in Nepal and is connected with the Karnali River Archaeological sites found in Jumla, Surkhet and Dailekh infer that the area was part of the old Khasa kingdom which was established during the 11th century. The capital of the Khas Kingdom was Sinja in present-day Jumla District. The kingdom expanded to a great extent in the 13th and 14th century; expanding to Garhwal in the west, Mansarowar and Guge regions of Tibet in the north, Gorkha-Nuwakot regions in the east and Kapilvastu with large areas of Terai in the south. After the late 14th century, the Khas empire collapsed and was divided into the Baise Rajya (22 principalities) in Karnali-Bheri region.

Before the unification of modern Nepal, a part of Karnali (from Karnali River to Bheri River) was in the Sanghiya Baise Rajya (22 principality confederacy). The principalities were sovereign but intermittently allied among themselves until they were annexed during the unification of modern Nepal from 1744 to 1810.

Geography
The province is surrounded by Gandaki Province in east, Lumbini Province in south-east and south, Sudurpashchim Province in the west and Tibet Autonomous Region of China in north.

The province has occupied higher mountains land of north and mid-hills of Nepal. It contains Kubi Gangri, Changla and Kanjiroba mountains in north. The Shey Phoksundo National Park with Phoksundo lake is the largest national park of Nepal and Rara lake is the largest lake of Nepal which are located in Karnali Province. Karnali River is the biggest river of the province which is thought to be the longest river in Nepal. Seti River and Bheri River are tributaries of Karnali, and Kupinde Daha is a lake of Karnali.

Demographics 
According to the 2011 Census of Nepal, Karnali Province has a population of 1,570,418 comprising 802,495 females and 767,923 males. The province has the lowest population in the country, having 5.93% of the population on 19.74% of the land. The population density of the province is 56 people per square kilometer.

Ethnic groups

Khas Arya is the largest ethno-linguistic indigenous group in the province, with Chhetri, Kami, Thakuri and Bahun dominating the population. The largest non-Khas Arya group are the Magars who make up 170,797 (10.88%) of the population. Tamang (0.88%) and Gurung (0.70%) are other Janajati groups in the province with a significant population.

Languages 

95.55% of the population in the province speak Nepali as their native language. Other languages spoken in the region are Magar (2.07%) and Tamang (0.72%).

The Language Commission of Nepal has recommended Magar as an additional official language in the province. The most spoken language is Nepali, which is known with its original name Khas Bhasha in the province.

Religion 

Hinduism is the most followed religion in the province with 95.34% of the people identifying as Hindus. Buddhists are the largest minority religion being followed by 3.09% and Christianity is the second-largest minority religion being followed by 1.30% of the population.

Government and administration 

The Governor acts as the head of the province while the Chief Minister is the head of the provincial government. The Chief Judge of the Surkhet High Court is the head of the judiciary. The present Governor, Chief Minister and Chief Judge are Govindra Prasad Kaulani, Jeevan Bahadur Shahi and Hari Kumar Pokharel respectively. The province has 40 provincial assembly constituencies, 12 House of Representative constituencies and eight National Assembly seats.

Karnali has a unicameral legislature, like all of the other provinces in Nepal. The term length of the provincial assembly is five years. The Provincial Assembly of Karnali Province is temporarily housed at the Irrigation Division Office in Birendranagar.

Administrative subdivisions 

Karnali is divided into ten districts.

A district is administrated by the head of the District Coordination Committee and the District Administration Officer. The districts are further dived to municipalities or rural municipalities which are further divided into wards. There are 25 municipalities and 54 rural municipalities in the province. The capital and largest city of the province is Birendranagar. It is only city in the province with a population of over 50,000.

Economy 
Karnali Province has the lowest growth rate in the country with an annual economic growth rate of 5.7% and is also contributes the least to the GDP at 4.1%. The province is among the poorest in Nepal with an estimated 28.9% of people living under absolute poverty (second highest in the country) and 51.7% of the people are multidimensionally poor (highest in the country). The unemployment rate in the province stands at 9.7% which is the third-lowest in the country.

Agriculture 
Karnali is the largest producer of barley in the country and accounted for 43% of the country's total share of barley production in 2018/19.

See also
Provinces of Nepal
List of districts in Nepal

References

 
Provinces of Nepal
2015 establishments in Nepal
States and territories established in 2015